Upper Milford Township is a township in Lehigh County, Pennsylvania. The township's population was 7,292 at the 2010 census. Upper Milford Township is a suburb of Allentown in the Lehigh Valley, which had a population of 861,899 and was the 68th most populous metropolitan area in the U.S. as of the 2020 census.

Geography
Upper Milford is in the Delaware River watershed and is drained by Little Lehigh Creek and Saucon Creek into Lehigh River and by Perkiomen Creek into the Schuylkill River.

While there are no large towns in the township, its most prominent villages are Old Zionsville, Powder Valley, Shimerville, Vera Cruz, and Zionsville. Dillinger is a small village in eastern Upper Milford Township. Corning and Sigmund are small villages in southwestern Upper Milford.

Upper Milford Township has a hot-summer humid continental climate (Dfa) and is in hardiness zone 6b.

Adjacent municipalities
Emmaus (north)
Salisbury Township (north)
Upper Saucon Township (northeast)
Lower Milford Township (southeast)
Upper Hanover Township (tangent to the south)
Hereford Township (southwest)
Lower Macungie Township (northwest)
Macungie (northwest)

Demographics

As of the census of 2000, there were 6,889 people, 2,514 households, and 2,021 families residing in the township.  The population density was 384.7 people per square mile (148.5/km2).  There were 2,576 housing units at an average density of 143.9/sq mi (55.5/km2).  The racial makeup of the township was 98.30% White, 0.16% African American, 0.09% Native American, 0.68% Asian, 0.20% from other races, and 0.57% from two or more races. Hispanic or Latino of any race were 1.02% of the population.

There were 2,514 households, out of which 34.7% had children under the age of 18 living with them, 72.2% were married couples living together, 5.7% had a female householder with no husband present, and 19.6% were non-families. 15.6% of all households were made up of individuals, and 5.3% had someone living alone who was 65 years of age or older.  The average household size was 2.74 and the average family size was 3.07.

In the township, the population was spread out, with 24.3% under the age of 18, 6.6% from 18 to 24, 28.8% from 25 to 44, 28.0% from 45 to 64, and 12.3% who were 65 years of age or older.  The median age was 40 years. For every 100 females there were 102.5 males.  For every 100 females age 18 and over, there were 100.7 males. The median income for a household in the township was $66,694, and the median income for a family was $72,159. Males had a median income of $47,532 versus $29,538 for females. The per capita income for the township was $30,454.  About 0.5% of families and 1.3% of the population were below the poverty line, including 1.0% of those under age 18 and none of those age 65 or over.

Public education

Upper Milford Township is served by the East Penn School District. Emmaus High School in Emmaus serves grades nine through 12. Eyer Middle School and Lower Macungie Middle School, both located in Macungie, serve grades six through eight.

Transportation

Roads and highways

Interstate 476 follows the Pennsylvania Turnpike's Northeast Extension along a northwest-southeast alignment through the township, but the nearest interchange is in South Whitehall Township. Pennsylvania Route 29 and Pennsylvania Route 100 meet in Shimerville and continue down Chestnut Street to Hereford just over the Berks County line. Chestnut Street, Kings Highway, Vera Cruz Road, and Powder Valley Road are all north-to-south routes. St. Peters Road/Shimerville Road/Main Road/Brunner Road crosses it SW-to-NE and Churchview Road proceeds east from Old Zionsville via Dillinger. Buckeye Road is an east-to-west road connecting Pennsylvania Route 29 (Chestnut Street) to Pennsylvania Route 100 in Macungie.

Public transportation
The township has not been served by LANta since bus service to and from Macungie was truncated to Emmaus except for the flex route 501, which requires a reservation and serves Allentown, Emmaus, Macungie, and Alburtis.

References

External links

Townships in Lehigh County, Pennsylvania
Townships in Pennsylvania